The 2019–20 Kenyan Premier League was the 17th season of the Kenyan Premier League, the top-tier football league in Kenya, since it began in 2003, and the 57th season of top-division football in Kenya since 1963. The season started on 30 August 2019, but was suspended in March 2020 due to the COVID-19 pandemic, and the final table was determined by the table at the half-way point of the season. As such, Gor Mahia were crowned champions and Chemelil Sugar were relegated, with SoNy Sugar having been expelled earlier in the season. Kisumu All Stars were later relegated after losing in a relegation play-off to Vihiga United.

Top scorers

Hat-tricks

References

Kenyan Premier League seasons
2019 in Kenyan football
2020 in Kenyan football
Kenya